"Shooting Time" is Swedish Indie Pop band Eggstone's second release, featuring four songs of which two later appeared on the band's debut album, Eggstone In San Diego, in 1992. In a contemporary review of the single, music journalist Kjell Häglund called it the "debut EP of the 90's".

It was later re-issued on CD in 1992 (as Eggstone At Point Loma), after the band signed with MNW label Snap.

Track listing

 "Shooting Time" (3:25)
 "Wrong Heaven" (3:40)
 "My Trumpets" (3:03)
 "Doesn't Matter" (3:05)

External links
Eggstone web site

1991 singles